"Here with You" is a song performed by Belgian DJ and record producer Lost Frequencies and Belgian drum and bass producer and musician Netsky, with uncredited vocals by Amy Yon. The song was released as a digital download on 30 June 2017 and was written by Tobias Kuhn, Boris Daenen, Felix De Laet and Amy Yon.

Music video
A music video to accompany the release of "Here with You" was first released onto YouTube on 18 July 2017 at a total length of two minutes and thirty-nine seconds.

Track listing

Charts

Weekly charts

Year-end charts

Certifications

Release history

References

2017 songs
2017 singles
Lost Frequencies songs
Netsky (musician) songs
Songs written by Tobias Kuhn
Songs written by Lost Frequencies